Maura Tombelli (born 1952 in Montelupo Fiorentino) is an Italian amateur astronomer who began her training in astronomy as an observer of variable stars. She is a prolific discoverer of almost 200 minor planets, including the main-belt asteroid 7794 Sanvito, and a member of the American Association of Variable Star Observers.

Career 
She is known as the only Italian female astrometrist. Together with Italian astronomers Ulisse Munari and Giuseppe Forti, she initiated a five-year survey of minor planets at Asiago Astrophysical Observatory in 1994. She also shared a lot of observing with the discoverers, especially the follow-up of near-Earth objects (NEOs), and she contributed to the discovery of 15817 Lucianotesi, the first NEO found from Italy. She is currently involved in a project to build a new observatory (Osservatorio di Montelupo) near the town of Montelupo, where she lives.

Awards and honors 
The main-belt asteroid 9904 Mauratombelli, discovered by Italian astronomers Andrea Boattini and Luciano Tesi in 1997, is named in her honour.

List of discovered minor planets

References

External links 
 https://web.archive.org/web/20100910014553/http://www.meteoritedoro.it/albo_doro_tombelli.htm 
 http://www.nove.firenze.it/vediarticolo.asp?id=97.05.21.00.14 

1952 births
Living people
People from Montelupo Fiorentino
21st-century Italian astronomers
20th-century Italian women scientists
Women astronomers
Discoverers of asteroids
20th-century Italian astronomers